Manuel Garza is the name of:

Manuel Garza Aldape, Mexican attorney
Manuel Garza González, Mexican politician
Manuel Garza Rendón, Mexican criminal